Old Times in North Yarmouth, Maine was a quarterly publication first printed in magazine form between 1877 and 1884 by Augustus W. Corliss. It covered the history and genealogy of the town of North Yarmouth, Maine. In 1977, a century after its first edition was printed, it was published in book form by the New Hampshire Publishing Company.

Subtitled A Magazine Devoted to the Preservation and Publication of Documents Relating to the Early History of North Yarmouth, Maine, it was printed across several volumes during Corliss' military career, which spanned forty years.

Corliss published the first issue in January 1877, and overall 32 issues were published through October 1884 – an average of 4.5 issues per year. He wrote about his own family, beginning with George Corliss (born in 1617), in January 1879's volume 3, number 1 edition.

He tried to revive the magazine as The Westcustogo Chronicle, but only one issue made it to print before publication stopped.

The only known library in possession of the book is the Family History Library in Salt Lake City, Utah.

References

External links
"Corliss Family", Volume 3, January 1879
North Yarmouth, Maine
Publications established in 1877
Publications disestablished in 1884
1977 books
History of Maine
Books about Maine
Defunct magazines published in the United States
Genealogy publications